is a former Japanese football player he is the current assistant coach of Japan U23.

Club career
Haneda was born in Ichikawa on December 1, 1981. After graduating from high school, he joined Kashima Antlers as center back in 2000. However he could hardly play in the match due to injuries. In addition, there were many center backs Yutaka Akita, Go Oiwa, Daiki Iwamasa and so on in the club. He moved to J2 League club Cerezo Osaka in 2007. He played many matches as defensive midfielder. In 2009, he played as regular player and the club was promoted to J1 League. He moved to Vissel Kobe in 2011. However he could hardly play in the match due to injury. He retired at the end of the 2012 season.

National team career
In June 2001, Haneda was selected Japan U-20 national team for 2001 World Youth Championship and he served captain. At this tournament, he played full time in all 3 matches as center back.

Club statistics

National team statistics

References

External links

1981 births
Living people
Association football people from Chiba Prefecture
Japanese footballers
Japan youth international footballers
J1 League players
J2 League players
Kashima Antlers players
Cerezo Osaka players
Vissel Kobe players
Association football midfielders